Selenium dioxide is the chemical compound with the formula SeO2. This colorless solid is one of the most frequently encountered compounds of selenium.

Properties
Solid SeO2 is a one-dimensional polymer, the chain consisting of alternating selenium and oxygen atoms.  Each Se atom is pyramidal and bears a terminal oxide group. The bridging Se-O bond lengths are 179 pm and the terminal Se-O distance is 162 pm.  The relative stereochemistry at Se alternates along the polymer chain (syndiotactic). 
In the gas phase selenium dioxide is present as dimers and other oligomeric species, at higher temperatures it is monomeric. The monomeric form adopts a bent structure very similar to that of sulfur dioxide with a bond length of 161 pm. The dimeric form has been isolated in a low temperature argon matrix and vibrational spectra indicate that it has a centrosymmetric chair form. Dissolution of SeO2 in selenium oxydichloride give the trimer [Se(O)O]3. 
Monomeric SeO2 is a polar molecule, with the dipole moment of 2.62 D   pointed from the midpoint of the two oxygen atoms to the selenium atom.

The solid sublimes readily. At very low concentrations the vapour has a revolting odour, resembling decayed horseradishes. At higher concentrations the vapour has an odour resembling horseradish sauce and can burn the nose and throat on inhalation.  Whereas SO2 tends to be molecular and SeO2 is a one-dimensional chain, TeO2 is a cross-linked polymer.

SeO2 is considered an acidic oxide: it dissolves in water to form selenous acid. Often the terms selenous acid and selenium dioxide are used interchangeably. It reacts with base to form selenite salts containing the  anion. For example, reaction with sodium hydroxide produces sodium selenite:

SeO2 +  2 NaOH  →  Na2SeO3  +  H2O

Preparation
Selenium dioxide is prepared by oxidation of selenium by burning in air or by reaction with nitric acid or hydrogen peroxide, but perhaps the most convenient preparation is by the dehydration of selenous acid.

2 H2O2 + Se  → SeO2 + 2 H2O

3 Se + 4 HNO3 + H2O  → 3 H2SeO3 + 4 NO
H2SeO3 ⇌ SeO2 + H2O

Occurrence
The natural form of selenium dioxide, downeyite, is a very rare mineral. It is only found at a small number of burning coal banks, where it forms around vents created from escaping gasses.

Uses

Organic synthesis
SeO2 is an important reagent in organic synthesis.  Oxidation of paraldehyde (acetaldehyde trimer) with SeO2 gives glyoxal and the oxidation of cyclohexanone gives 1,2-Cyclohexanedione. The selenium starting material is reduced to selenium, and precipitates as a red amorphous solid which can easily be filtered off. This type of reaction is called a Riley oxidation. It is also renowned as a reagent for "allylic" oxidation, a reaction that entails the following conversion

This can be described more generally as;
R2C=CR'-CHR"2  +  [O] →  R2C=CR'-C(OH)R"2
where R, R', R" may be alkyl or aryl substituents.

Selenium dioxide can also be used to synthesize 1,2,3-selenadiazoles from acylated hydrazone derivatives.

As a colorant
Selenium dioxide imparts a red colour to glass. It is used in small quantities to counteract the colour due to iron impurities and so to create (apparently) colourless glass. In larger quantities, it gives a deep ruby red colour.

Selenium dioxide is the active ingredient in some cold-bluing solutions.

It was also used as a toner in photographic developing.

Safety
Selenium is an essential element, but ingestion of more than 5 mg/day leads to nonspecific symptoms.

References

External links

Selenium(IV) compounds
Photographic chemicals
Acidic oxides
Interchalcogens